The Lenovo ThinkPad T430 is a Laptop computer released by Lenovo in the ThinkPad series.

Lenovo also released the ThinkPad T431.

References 

Lenovo laptops
ThinkPad